This is a list of Kazakh football transfers that took place during the 2019 summer transfer window by club. Only clubs of the 2019 Kazakhstan Premier League are included.
The summer transfer window ran from 26 June, to 24 July 2019.

Kazakhstan Premier League 2019

Aktobe

In:

Out:

Astana

In:

Out:

Atyrau

In:

Out:

Irtysh Pavlodar

In:

Out:

Kairat

In:

Out:

Kaisar

In:

Out:

Okzhetpes

In:

Out:

Ordabasy

In:

Out:

Shakhter Karagandy

In:

Out:

Taraz

In:

Out:

Tobol

In:

Out:

Zhetysu

In:

Out:

References

Kazakhstan
2019
Transfers